"No Me Dejes de Querer" (Never Stop Loving Me) is a song by Gloria Estefan, released as the first single from her third Spanish album Alma Caribeña. It reached number 77 on the Billboard Hot 100. A dance remix reached number 8 on the Hot Dance Club Play chart.

Song history
Following the success of "Music of My Heart", "No Me Dejes De Querer" was a hit for Estefan and she won her first Latin Grammy Award in the category of Best Music Video at the first ceremony celebrated for these awards in September 2000. "No Me Dejes de Querer" became her first Spanish language-song to enter the Billboard Hot 100, and is also her highest-charting Spanish-language song on that chart.

Composition
For her album Alma Caribeña, Estefan, her husband Emilio Estefan Jr., and singer Robert Blades incorporated various Latin music styles from the islands of the Caribbean. The song "No Me Dejes De Querer" brought together tropical music and Latin music to form "tropical Latin". The rhythm of the song switches between Afro-Cuban clave and non-clave Latin beats. The song carries a feeling of salsa and mambo dancing. The instruments include acoustic guitars, a horn section, and Latin percussion.

Chart performance

References

External links
Lyrics with English translation

2000 singles
Gloria Estefan songs
Spanish-language songs
Number-one singles in Spain
Epic Records singles
Latin Grammy Award for Best Short Form Music Video
Songs written by Emilio Estefan
Songs written by Gloria Estefan
2000 songs
Song recordings produced by George Noriega

es:No me dejes de querer